David Horn may refer to:

 David Bayne Horn (1901–1969), British historian 
 David Horn (biologist), British biologist
 David Horn (Israeli physicist) (born 1937)